Connie the Cow is a children's television series created by Josep Viciana, and designed by Roman Rybakiewicz. It was produced by Spain-based studio Neptuno Films, and it aired on TV3 in Catalonia. In the United States, it aired on Noggin.

The show combined 2D cel animation for the backgrounds with 3D digital animation for the characters.

Plot
A curious young cow named Connie explores her colorful world.

Characters
 Connie (voiced by Andrea Vega Guzman in Season 1 and Ayseha Mendham in Seasons 2-3) is a young female cow. She is very curious, and always tries new things.
 Patch (voiced by Alex Warner) is a playful dog who lives near Connie's farmhouse. He is introduced in the episode "Patch the Stray Dog".
 Wally is a plump multicolored bird who lives in a tree near the farm.
 Grouch is an aptly-named irritable fox.
 Mollie and Bill are Connie's mother and father. They give Connie advice and help out with problems.
 Clara is Connie's grandmother who wears a hat with flowers on it.
 Hedgy is a hedgehog who wears a sock over his nose.
 Maddie is a lamb with orange wool. 
 Paddy and Pearl are pigs and Connie's neighbors.
 Dodger is a naughty and crafty cat who likes to steal cakes and tease other animals.
 Snooze is a lazy and tired turtle who likes to sleep inside his shell.
 Sergeant is a sheepdog with a blunt attitude.
 Spike is a spider who likes to play the harp that he made with twigs, leaves, and silk.
 Tom is an ant with six purple legs and antennas. He is part of the ant colony that work together carrying the food and plants.  
 Todd is a colorful mole who lives underground.
 Nibble is a squirrel that is often very busy carrying every acorn to her tree. She even has two children.
 Donna is a duck and has her ducklings floating across the river.
 Fast Feather is an eagle who lives on top of the mountain and usually puffs the clouds across the sky with his wings.
 Sandy is a sea turtle who lives at the beach. She has a flower-patterned shell.
 Norbert is a beaver who spends his time gnawing wood to build dams.
 Ronny is a mouse who rolls his cheese through the grass.
 Sam is a rabbit who lives in the forest.
 Henry is an owl who helps Connie with her adventures.
 Cyril is a wolf one of Patch's friends.
 Burt is a bat that lives in the cave.
 Finny is a fish that lives in the water.
 John is a frog who lives in the pond.
 Scoot is a snake who likes to sleep.
 Belinda is a goat with orange fur.
 William is a rainbow-colored worm.
 Rebecca is a chicken who has several chicks.

Episodes

Season 1
 "A Curious Butterfly": Connie chases a butterfly away from home.
 "Present for Mummy": Connie finds her mother the perfect birthday present.
 "The Christmas Tree": Connie needs help finding the special Christmas tree her mom told her about.
 "The Crafty Cat": Connie tries to be sly like Dodger the crafty cat but she learns to be honest at the same time.
 "The Lazy Clouds": Connie helps make the clouds cry for the sheep so it can rain.
 "Patch the Stray Dog": Connie meets an unlike friendly dog named Patch and helps him find a family.
 "The Ugly Caterpillar": Connie learns that caterpillars can be ugly or beautiful, and they transform into butterflies.
 "Connie and Her Grandmother": Connie's grandma takes Connie on a nature walk to show how to love and respect nature.
 "The Grumpy Fox": Connie and her new friend Patch help Grouch the fox cheer up.
 "Wally Bird": Connie goes on a picnic with Grouch and Patch but it ends up on an unexpected adventure because of one very silly bird.
 "Hide and Seek": Connie wants to play hide and seek with Grouch and Wally, but she does not know how to count.
 "The Little Bear": Connie helps an orange bear gets back to its family.
 "A Cold Weather Adventure": To warm Connie while exploring the cold weather, Maddie the lamb rides on Connie's back.
 "The Snow Ghost": Connie, Grouch and Patch mistake a mole for a snow ghost because of his hard digging.
 "The Snowman"
 "The Wolf": Connie meets a wolf that helps Maddie the lamb get back to her parents.
 "The Busy Squirrel": Connie helps a squirrel jump.
 "The Magic Spring": Drinking one of the beaver dam's water, a spring gets Connie into a cow.
 "The Lonely Flower": Connie and Patch help a flower get happy for its special event.
 "The Bird Who Didn't Know How To Fly"
 "A Visit to Grandmother's": Connie gets an invitation to visit her grandma's shed in the woods.
 "A Sock for Hedgy": Hedgy loses the sock that goes on his nose and is upset and shivering in the cold weather, so Connie and Patch must help him find his sock.
 "The Surprise Party": Connie, Grouch and Patch prepare a surprise birthday party for Wally.
 "Wally's Nest": Wally loses his nest and Connie and Patch help him find it.
 "A Toy for Patch": When the ball that Connie and Patch play with is squashed, Connie helps find a new toy for Patch.
 "The Search for Patch's Color": Connie helps Patch reunite with his original color; after that, Connie becomes white, then reunites with her original color.
 "Connie Wants to Be Different"
 "Patch's Wonderful Nose": Patch helps his nose get his sense of smell back.
 "Connie and the Colors": Grandma Clara teaches the friends a game about colors.
 "Connie and the Little Lamb"
 "Connie and the Turtle": Connie and Patch help a lost turtle return to her family.
 "A Hot Day": With the help of her friend the beaver, Connie creates a new swimming pool just for her insect friends.
 "The Travelling Tree"
 "The Five Senses"
 "Connie and the Stork"
 "The Race": Snooze and Dodger have a race and Dodger is determined to win.
 "Connie and the Butterflies"
 "Mummy's Hat": Connie mistakes a lost hat as her mom's.
 "Adventures on the River"
 "What a Lot of Babies": Connie and Patch have fun with birds.
 "Connie and the Cricket": Connie tries to imitate an amazing cricket.
 "Detective Connie": Connie and Patch solve a mystery that involves a path that leads somewhere strange.
 "A Trip with Mum and Dad": Connie and her parents go out on a trip around the forest.
 "Connie and Her Friends": Connie learns that friends can have other friends, when she sees Patch playing with Cyril the wolf.
 "The Trial of Strength"
 "Connie Learns About Shapes": Connie, Patch, Grouch, and Wally play a game about shapes with the lead by Mole.
 "The Vain Bird": Connie meets a vain musical bird and a spider named Spike that have something in common, they both have the same beautiful singing voices, so the friends put on a singing competition during the night.
 "Follow the Clues": Grandma Clara teaches Connie and Patch a follow the clues game that would lead to some animals very special.
 "Connie and Patch in Disguise": Connie's parents watch Connie and Patch playing in disguise.
 "The Lucky Stone"
 "The Bridge": Connie and her friends create a bridge across the river with the help of Connie's father.
 "The Birthday Present"

Season 2
 "The Beaver's Dam": Connie and Patch cannot get water from the beaver's dam.
 "The Ant and the Grasshopper": Connie's friend Sergeant tells all of her friends the story of the ant and the grasshopper.
 "Connie and the Tin Can"
 "Connie and the Fruit"
 "The Talking Mountain"
 "The Secret Den"
 "Burt Wants to Play": Connie and Patch help Burt the bat have fun.
 "Honey for Mummy": Connie searches for honey to make a cake.
 "It's Going to Rain"
 "Lost in the Snow"
 "Connie and the Riddle"
 "The Sad Tortoise"
 "The Mysterious Wood"
 "Grandma Makes Jam"
 "The Wonderful World of Nature"
 "The Cat and the Puppy"
 "Where's the Food?"
 "Animals and Their Jobs"
 "Going South for the Winter"
 "Wally's Hat"
 "Connie Hunts for Treasure"
 "The Creature that Could Change Colour"
 "Where's Spike?"
 "Baby Bird and His Nest"
 "The Multi-Colored Snow"
 "The Ant Who Couldn't Concentrate"
 "The Sleepy Bird": During a long night, Connie and Patch follow a sleep-walking Wally.
 "Spot the Difference"
 "The Little Piglet"
 "Connie's Breakfast"
 "The Mysterious Plant"
 "The Singing Frog"
 "Looking for Presents"
 "Connie and the Insects"
 "The Valley of the Butterflies"
 "The Strongest Animal in the Woods"
 "Patch Wants to Fly": Connie helps Patch fly.
 "Making Colors": Grandma Clara teaches Connie and Patch how to make new colors.
 "The Day it Snowed in Springtime"
 "Who Do I Look Like?"
 "Playing with Stones"
 "The Adventurous Ant"
 "Connie's Orchestra": Connie and her friends create an orchestra using different types of instruments.
 "A Different Breakfast"
 "Lots and Lots of Walnuts"
 "Where Does it Belong?"
 "Looking for Grandma": Connie sets out on a quest for her grandma.
 "Connie and the Apple Tree"
 "Cactus Flower"
 "Songs in the Snow": After Connie listens to her mother singing a beautiful Christmas song, Connie and Patch ask their friends if they know any songs, but it turns out they only know the same one Connie's mother sang.
 "The Vain Butterfly"

Season 3
 "The Big Surprise"
 "The Selfish Butterflies"
 "Looking For The Color Yellow"
 "All Shapes and Sizes"
 "The Sounds of Nature"
 "Snow in the Woods"
 "The Animal That Had One Leg"
 "The Puzzle"
 "The Strange Trail"
 "The Yellow Ball"
 "Connie Helps the Flowers"
 "Daddy's Party"
 "Good Friends"
 "Happy Times"
 "The Fruit Festival"
 "Connie and the Rodents"
 "Look Carefully"
 "A Ferret Called Willow"
 "Nature Day"
 "A Time for Everything"
 "The Story of the Two Friends": Connie makes up a story about the good times she had with Patch.
 "Dear Mummy and Daddy": Connie writes a poem for her parents.
 "The Basket of Blackberries": Connie and Patch search for a missing basket of blackberries.
 "The Little Fish"
 "Hedgy's Spines"
 "Mummy Tells a Story": When Connie babysits Maddie the lamb for the night, Connie's mother tells them a story about a group of caterpillars.

Broadcast
In April 2001, TV-Loonland AG announced they had pre-sold the series in the United Kingdom to Disney Television International to air on their Playhouse Disney channel in the country. The company would later extend the Disney deal to Germany in November 2004. In Germany, the series was also aired as the last segment in certain mid-2000s episodes of Sesame Street'''s German co-production Sesamstraße''.

The show, dubbed in English in the United Kingdom, was broadcast on Noggin in the United States from 2003 to 2007. The series was rerun in the United States from 2017 to 2018 on Starz Kids & Family.

References

External links

2000s Spanish television series
2001 Spanish television series debuts
2005 Spanish television series endings
2000s animated television series
Spanish children's animated television series
Animated preschool education television series
2000s preschool education television series
Animated television series about children
Television series by Alliance Atlantis
Television series about cattle
English-language television shows